DNQ may refer to:

 Diazonaphthoquinone, a chemical compound
 "Did not qualify", signifying a failure to qualify to participate in a sporting event
 Deniliquin Airport, IATA airport code "DNQ"